Ramesh Chandra Shah is an Indian poet, novelist, critic and the author of Sahitya Academy Award winning novel, Vinayak. He was honoured by the Government of India in 2004 with Padma Shri, the fourth highest Indian civilian award.

Biography
Ramesh Chandra Shah was born on 1937 in the hilly village of Almora in the Indian state of Uttarakhand in family with moderate financial means and educational background. He graduated from Allahabad University and secured his masters (MA) in English literature from the same university in 1960. He obtained a doctoral degree (PhD) on the thesis, Yeats and Eliot: Perspectives on India, from Agra University. He began teaching in the high school at Barechhina (Uttaranchal) and later taught in remote colleges in the small towns of Sidhi and Panna in Madhya Pradesh before moving to Bhopal. He retired as HOD English Literature from Hamidia college in 1997. after which he chaired Nirala Srijnanpith, a literary chair instituted by Bharat Bhavan till 2000.

Shah is credited with several books composed of poems, short stories, travelogue, essays and novels. His first novel, Gobar Ganesh, based on the lives of middle-class families in Almora, came out in 2004. Vinayak, a 2011 work which is considered by many as an extension of his first novel, fetched him the Sahitya Academy Award in 2014. Years earlier, the Government of India honoured him with the civilian award of Padma Shri.

Shah survives his wife, Jyotsna Milan, a Mumbai born writer who died in 2014. He lives in Bhopal.

Books and publications
Novels

 Gobarganesh
 Kissa Gulam
 Poorvapar
 Aakhiri Din
 Punarvaas
 Aap Kahin Nahin Rehte Vibhooti Babu
 Vinayak

Short story anthologies

 Jungle Mein Aag
 Muhalle Mein Ravan
 Maanpatr
 Theater
 Pratinidhi Kahaniyan
 Katha Sanatan

Poems

 Kachue Ki Peeth Par
 Harishchandra Aao
 Nadi Bhaagti Aayi
 Pyaare Muchkund Ko
 Dekhte Hain Shabd Bhi Apna Samay
 Chaak Par Samay
 Bahuvacana

Essays

 Rachna Ke Badle
 Shaitaan Ke Bahaane
 Aadmi Ka Peda
 Padhte Padhte
 Svadharm Aur Kaalgati
 Hindi Ki Duniya Mein
 Ancestral Voices

Plays

 Maara Jaai Khusro
 Matiyaburj

Others

 Ek Lambi Chaanh (travelogue)
 Mere Sakshaatkaar (interviews)

See also

 Bharat Bhavan

References

Further reading
 
 
 
 
 *

External links
 
 
 
 

Recipients of the Padma Shri in literature & education
Indian male poets
Poets from Uttarakhand
People from Almora
People from Almora district
Indian male novelists
Recipients of the Sahitya Akademi Award in Hindi
1937 births
Living people
20th-century Indian poets
20th-century Indian novelists
20th-century Indian short story writers
Indian male short story writers
20th-century Indian essayists
Indian male essayists
Novelists from Uttarakhand
20th-century Indian male writers